The South Carolina Botanical Garden (295 acres) is located in Clemson, South Carolina on the campus of Clemson University.  This garden has nature trails, pathways, ponds, streams, woodlands, trial gardens, The Bob Campbell Geology Museum, and the Fran Hanson Discovery Center, which has exhibits by local artists. It is open to the public every day of the week. The Bob Campbell Geology Museum features more than 10,000 rocks, minerals and fossils and has exhibits focused on geological and paleontological topics.

The gardens are the home of the historic Hanover House, which is an early 18th-century house built in the South Carolina Low Country and moved to the Clemson campus. It also has a pioneer village featuring the Hunt Log Cabin, which was originally built about 1825 in the Seneca, South Carolina area.

The South Carolina Botanical Garden features one of the largest collections of nature-based sculptures in the country. The extended-ephemeral pieces were each designed on-site by international artists and built by local volunteers and students within one month. Upon completion, the pieces begin to return to nature, so while many may still be found in the Garden, others have disappeared without a trace.

See also
 List of botanical gardens in the United States

External links

Official Website
Fran Hanson Discovery Center
Bob Campbell Geology Museum
Maps of the South Carolina Botanical Garden

Clemson University
Protected areas of Pickens County, South Carolina
Botanical gardens in South Carolina
Sculpture gardens, trails and parks in the United States
Art museums and galleries in South Carolina
Museums in Pickens County, South Carolina
Geology museums in the United States
Natural history museums in South Carolina
Nature centers in South Carolina
Clemson, South Carolina